The church forests in Ethiopia are small fragments of forest surrounding Ethiopian Orthodox Tewahedo Churches. Northern Ethiopia was once covered in forests, but due to deforestation for agriculture, only about 4% of the original forested lands remain. Church leaders have long held the belief that a church needs to be surrounded by a forest, and these sacred forests have been tended for some 1,500 years. Aerial photographs of church forests show them as small verdant islands surrounded by vast areas of tilled lands and pasture. It is estimated that these church forests represent the bulk of the remaining forested land in the Ethiopian Highlands.

At risk

The isolated forests have been dwindling in size due to edge effects through encroachment by the surrounding agriculture, both from the grazing of cattle that would shelter and feed in the forests, as well as encroaching tilling of fields. The outermost trees of these islands of forest were found to be stressed and dying.

Forest ecologist Dr. Alemayehu Wassie and conservation scientist Meg Lowman were alarmed at the rate at which the church forests were shrinking. If reforestation would ever be likely in the future, they needed to help conserve and increase these last remaining forests which are the natural seed banks for local genetic diversity of tree species.

Conservation efforts

Studies were conducted and it was found almost no new growth of tree species occurred in areas where cattle were allowed to graze, as the cattle would eat all the young seedlings that germinated. Similarly, human incursions into the forest creating pathways at random, also stressed the church forests. Researchers found that church forests that were surrounded by walls — a rare occurrence — had a higher density and variety of seedlings than forests without walls, "because it likely reduced access to the forests by grazers and directed human visitors to trails."

Working with the religious leaders, it was decided to exclude cattle by building dry stone walls around the forests. Entry gates were included and people were allowed in and out through established pathways. The dry stone walls were similar in construction to the walls of the inner churchyard. Locals helped collect stones from their fields, which in turn helped their crops by removing the rocks from the fields, and also helped to build walls around their local church forests.

The religious significance of the forest is equalled by its ecological functions. These sacred oases raise water tables, lower temperature, block destructive winds and are home to yield-boosting pollinators essential to surrounding agriculture.

Birds, bees, monkeys, caracals and other wildlife were found to have returned to the church forests. Tree seeds were germinating and seedlings growing. In some cases they built the walls beyond the perimeter of the forest to extend the size of the forest.

See also
 Afromontane
 List of types of formally designated forests

References

External links
 The Church Forests of Ethiopia — short film by Jeremy Seifert, 11 January 2020
 Gardens of Eden: the church forests of Ethiopia – a photo essay The Guardian, 8 November 2021
 The 'sacred forests' of northern Ethiopia BBC, 21 May 2019
 How Churches are the Gatekeepers of Ethiopia's Forests Africa Geographic, 24 April 2015

Forests of Ethiopia